Sibylle Günter (born 20 April 1964) is a German theoretical physicist researching tokamak plasmas. Since February 2011, she has headed the Max Planck Institute for Plasma Physics. In October 2015, she was elected a member of the Academia Europaea in recognition of her contribution to research.

Biography
Born in Rostock, Günter matriculated from high school in 1982. She went on to study physics at the University of Rostock where she graduated in 1987 and earned a doctorate in 1990 with a dissertation on radiation from dense plasmas. After working as a research associate in the university's department of theoretical physics, she received her postdoctoral habilitation in 1996. 
Her work in Rostock was complemented by periods in the United States at the University of Maryland and at the National Institute of Standards and Technology.

In 1996, she joined the Tokamak Physics division of the Max Planck Institute for Plasma Physics (IPP) in Garching near Munich. In 2000, she was appointed director of the institute and head of Tokamak Physics coordinating research on the principles of a fusion plant designed to produce energy resulting from the fusion of light ions. In 2011, she became IPP's scientific director.

In October 2015, in view of her outstanding contribution to research, the Academia Europaea's board elected Sibylle Günter a member of the Academy.

Selected publications

Awards
Günter has received the following awards:
2013: Order of Merit of the Federal Republic of Germany
2015: Member of the German Academy of Science and Engineering
2015: Member of the Academia Europaea
2020: Member of the German Academy of Sciences Leopoldina

References

1964 births
21st-century German physicists
21st-century German women scientists
German women physicists
Living people
Members of Academia Europaea
People from Rostock
Recipients of the Cross of the Order of Merit of the Federal Republic of Germany
Members of the German Academy of Sciences Leopoldina